Marsch der Kampfgruppen der Arbeiterklasse, or the March of the Combat Groups of the Working Class, was an East German military marching song of the Combat Groups of the Working Class (Kampfgruppen der Arbeiterklasse, KdA). It was the official marching song of the organisation from 1953 until its abolishment in 1990, when the German reunification took place. The melody was composed by Willi Kaufmann and the lyrics were written by Max Zimmering.

Lyrics

External links 
 Marsch der Kampfgruppen on Youtube

References 

German songs
East German music
German military marches